This is an incomplete list of the paintings of René Magritte (21 November 1898 – 15 August 1967), a key surrealist painter known for the wittiness of his work.

Timeline 
 1898–1925 Early Years
 1926–1930 Paris
 1931–1942 Brussels
 1943–1947 Sunlit Period
 1947–1948 Vache Period
 1949–1960 Mature Period
 1961–1967 Later Years

Paintings by Magritte 
This list includes paintings attributed to Magritte.

1898–1925 Early Years

1926-1930 Paris

1931-1942 Brussels

1943-1947 Sunlit Period

1947-1948 Vache Period

1949-1960 Mature Period

1961-1967 Later Years

References

External links
 The biography and works of René Magritte
 René Magritte Museum, Brussels
 Rene Magritte: List of works

 
Magritte